B. fulgida may refer to:

 Blackburnia fulgida, a ground beetle
 Brocadia fulgida, a bacterium that performs the anammox process